The Ministry of Foreign Affairs is a cabinet ministry of Yemen. The ministry is responsible for conducting foreign relations of the country.

List of ministers
The following is a list of foreign ministers of Yemen since the 1990 unification:

For ministers of foreign affairs of the Yemen Arab Republic before the 1990 unification, see Minister of Foreign Affairs of North Yemen.

References

External links
 

1990 establishments in Yemen
Yemen
Foreign Affairs
Yemen